María Valle López (born 14 November 2004) is a Spanish footballer who plays as a defender for Real Betis.

Club career
Valle started her career at Sevilla's academy.

References

External links
Profile at La Liga

2004 births
Living people
Women's association football defenders
Spanish women's footballers
People from Los Palacios y Villafranca
Sportspeople from the Province of Seville
Footballers from Andalusia
Sevilla FC (women) players
Real Betis Féminas players
Primera División (women) players
Spain women's youth international footballers